Scarborough General Hospital can refer to:

 Scarborough General Hospital (England)
 Scarborough General Hospital, Tobago
 Scarborough General Hospital (Toronto)